Brian Quintenz is an American financial manager and policy advisor who served on the Commodity Futures Trading Commission from 2017 to 2021.

Biography 
He is the former head of Saeculum Capital Management, an investment firm which he founded in 2013. In March 2016, Quintenz was nominated by President Barack Obama to be a commissioner on the Commodity Futures Trading Commission. His nomination, which required confirmation by the U.S. Senate, was not voted on before Congress ended its session for the year. In early 2017, President Donald Trump withdrew Quintenz's nomination to the Commodity Futures Trading Commission before renominating him to serve the remainder of a five-year term expiring on April 13, 2020. Quintenz was confirmed by the U.S. Senate on August 3, 2017, and began service on the commission on August 15. He resigned effective August 31, 2021.

Earlier in his career, Quintenz was a consultant with Rose International and was a senior associate at Hill-Townsend Capital. He worked for U.S. Representative Deborah Pryce from 2001 to 2007, starting as a staff assistant before being promoted to senior policy advisor.

References

Living people
Duke University alumni
Georgetown University alumni
American money managers
Trump administration personnel
Year of birth missing (living people)
Washington, D.C., Republicans
Commodity Futures Trading Commission personnel